Pandan Jaya LRT station is a Malaysian low-rise rapid transit station situated near and named after Pandan Jaya, in Ampang Jaya, Selangor. The station is part of the Ampang Line (formerly known as STAR, and the Ampang and Sri Petaling Lines). The station was opened on December 16, 1996, as part of the first phase of the STAR system's opening, alongside 13 adjoining stations along the Sultan Ismail-Ampang route.

The station shares a similar name with the neighbouring Pandan Indah station 1 kilometre northeast, leading to some confusion among passengers.

Location

The Pandan Jaya station is situated in and named after the Ampang Jaya locality of Pandan Jaya, and is within walking distance of the village of Kampung Kerayong to the west and the localities of Taman Shamelin Perkasa (Malay; English: Shamelin Perkasa Estate), Taman Maju Jaya (Maju Jaya Estate) and Taman Cheras Indah (Cheras Indah Estate) to the south. The station is also situated beside Kerayong River, which borders Pandan Jaya and other aforementioned areas. The station is accessible from Pandan Jaya via a complex of flats to the north, and a footbridge across Kerayong River to Jalan Pandan Indah (Pandan Indah Road) to the south.

The Pandan Jaya station was constructed along two leveled tracks, reusing the now defunct Federated Malay States Railway and Malayan Railway route between Kuala Lumpur, Ampang town and Salak South.

Design

Overall, the Pandan Jaya station was built as a low-rise station along two tracks for trains traveling in opposite direction. The station is nearly subsurface and features two side platforms, the station designates separate ticketing areas for each of the station's two platforms at their level, and because there are no pedestrian bridges to link the two platform access to trains traveling the opposite direction is not possible without leaving the pay-area. The station also serves as a public crossing across the Ampang Line tracks between localities at both sides of Kerayong River via a walkway running underneath the tracks and platforms.

The principal styling of the station is similar to most other stations in the line, featuring curved roofs supported by latticed frames, and white plastered walls and pillars. Because stairways are only used to link street level with the station's ticket areas and platforms, the station is not accommodating to disabled users.

See also

 List of rail transit stations in Klang Valley

External links 
Pandan Jaya LRT Station - mrt.com.my

Ampang Line
Railway stations opened in 1996
1996 establishments in Malaysia